Kevin Black may refer to:
Kevin Black (broadcaster) (1943–2013), New Zealand radio broadcaster
Kevin Black (wrestling coach) (born 1979), former American wrestler and current wrestling coach
Kevin Black (The Red Green Show), a fictional character